Baron Empain is a title of nobility of the Kingdom of Belgium. The title was created in 1907 by Leopold II of Belgium for Édouard Empain, a wealthy Belgian engineer, entrepreneur, financier and industrialist, as well as an amateur Egyptologist. The title is hereditary and descends to the senior male by agnatic primogeniture.

Barons Empain (1907)
 Édouard Empain, 1st Baron Empain (1852-1929)
 Jean Empain, 2nd Baron Empain (1902-1946)
 Édouard-Jean Empain, 3rd Baron Empain (1937-2018)
 Jean Francois Empain, 4th Baron Empain (b.1964)

References

Barons of Belgium
1907 establishments in Belgium
Noble titles created in 1907

Baron Empain Palace in Heliopolis, Cairo was renovated and opened to public June 30th 2020